Trail to Vengeance is a 1945 American Western film directed by Wallace Fox and written by Robert Creighton Williams. The film stars Kirby Grant, Fuzzy Knight, Poni Adams, Tom Fadden, John Kelly and Frank Jaquet. The film was released on June 1, 1945, by Universal Pictures.

Plot

Cast        
Kirby Grant as Jeff Gordon
Fuzzy Knight as Hungry Huggins
Poni Adams as Dorothy Jackson 
Tom Fadden as Horace Glumm
John Kelly as Bully
Frank Jaquet as Foster Felton
Stanley Andrews as Sheriff Morgan
Walter Baldwin as Bart Jackson
Beatrice Gray as Alice Gordon

References

External links
 

1945 films
American Western (genre) films
1945 Western (genre) films
Universal Pictures films
Films directed by Wallace Fox
American black-and-white films
1940s English-language films
1940s American films